Alaques River is a river of Ecuador. It flows through Cotopaxi Province and passes near Latacunga. It is a tributary of the Cutuchi River.

References

Rivers of Ecuador